The Science of Spying is a touring exhibition produced by The Science of..., a joint venture between the Science Museum (London) and Fleming Media. The Science of Spying opened at the Science Museum on 10 February 2007 and a duplicate exhibition opened in the Children's Museum of Indianapolis on 16 March 2007. The exhibition is scheduled to tour venues around the world for 5 years.

Exhibition content
The Science of Spying, designed by Jump Studios, looks at spying today and in the future. It is interactive and aimed at a family audience. The interactivity includes various individual exhibits and a 'Spy ID card' which visitors are issued with when they enter the exhibition. A storyline involving the organisations 'Spymaker' and 'Osteck' runs throughout the exhibition. Themes include the basic skills of spies, new spy gadgets and the use of new technologies by spies. The exhibition also hints at the effects of new security and surveillance technologies on the rest of society.

Exhibition sections
Visitors begin in the Spymaker Training Base where they find out about basic spy skills in a number of interactive exhibits. These include spotting a liar, cracking a code and breaking into a safe.

The second section of the exhibition is the Spymaker Technology Centre where visitors find out how technology can enhance a spies basic skills and also provide new challenges. Visitors take a biometric face scan, search through digital databases for clues and visit the gadget van.

Next visitors go on a 'mission' into Osteck's headquarters. They must tackle interactive exhibits which are not necessarily quite what they seem. Their goal is to find a secret password to help thwart the Osteck threat. Visitors tap phone lines, break into computer systems and track things on surveillance cameras.

In the final section, visitors explore Osteck's Future lab with various innocent and not so innocent spying and surveillance products are on display. After foiling Osteck's plans, visitors must escape by fooling an artificial intelligence TV monitoring system.

Development and opening
The development team consulted with many experts during development, including former MI6 officer, Harry Ferguson, as well as scientists and engineers. The exhibition was opened by Stella Remington, a former head of MI5.

See also
The Science of Aliens
The Science of Survival

References

External links
The Science Museum, London
The Science of...
Jump Studios
The Exhibitions Agency Ltd.

Science exhibitions
Traveling exhibits
Espionage in culture